Amager Strand station is a rapid transit station on the Copenhagen Metro, located in the Sundbyøster district of Copenhagen. It opened on 28 September 2007. It is named after the nearby beach at Amager Strandpark.

The station serves the M2 line, in fare zone 3.

External links
 Amager Strand station on www.m.dk 
 Amager Strand station on www.m.dk 

M2 (Copenhagen Metro) stations
Railway stations opened in 2007
Railway stations in Denmark opened in the 21st century